Clark Robertson (born 5 September 1993) is a Scottish professional footballer who plays as a centre-back for Portsmouth.

Career

He signed a full-time contract with Aberdeen in June 2009, and made his debut for the club in a 3–1 defeat to Hamilton Academical on 1 May 2010.

Robertson was selected for the Scotland national under-21 football team in April 2012, but was forced to withdraw due to a knee injury.

In May 2012, Robertson signed a new three-year deal with Aberdeen, tying him to the club until 2015. He was released by Aberdeen in June 2015 and subsequently signed for Blackpool.

In July 2018, Robertson signed a three-year deal with Championship side Rotherham United. He scored his first Rotherham United goal on 27 November 2018, in a 2–2 home draw against Queens Park Rangers. On 17 May 2021, Rotherham United published their retained list, and confirmed Robertson would be leaving the club at the end of his contract.

On 22 June 2021, it was announced that Robertson had signed a two-year contract with Portsmouth, and would join them on 1 July. He would suffer an injury in September that ended in December but didn’t play a game back until January. He went on to score his first goal for the club against former team Rotherham United in a 3-0 Pompey win.
He has told his teammates he’d rather retire than join Derby in January

Career statistics

Honours
Blackpool
EFL League Two play-offs: 2017

References

External links
Guardian Stats Centre

1993 births
Living people
Association football defenders
Scottish footballers
Aberdeen F.C. players
Blackpool F.C. players
Rotherham United F.C. players
Portsmouth F.C. players
Scottish Premier League players
Footballers from Aberdeen
Scotland youth international footballers
Scotland under-21 international footballers
Scottish Professional Football League players
English Football League players